Pisang cokelat (banana chocolate in Indonesian) or sometimes colloquially abbreviated as piscok, is an Indonesian sweet snack made of slices of banana with melted chocolate or chocolate syrup, wrapped inside thin crepe-like pastry skin and being deep fried. Pisang cokelat is often simply described as "choco banana spring rolls". It is often regarded as a hybrid between another Indonesian favourites; pisang goreng (fried banana) and lumpia (spring roll). 

The type of banana being used is similar to pisang goreng; preferably pisang uli, pisang kepok or pisang raja sereh. The skin used for wrapping is usually the readily available lumpia skin. In Indonesia, pisang cokelat is regarded as a variant of pisang goreng, and categorized under gorengan (Indonesian assorted fritters) and sold together with some popular fried stuff; such as fried tempeh, tahu goreng and pisang goreng. It is a popular snack that can be found from humble street side kakilima cart to cafes and fancy restaurants.

Pisang cokelat is almost identical to Philippines turon, which is actually a banana lumpia, except in this Indonesian version chocolate content is a must, not optional.

See also

 Banana cue
 Fried plantain
 List of banana dishes
 Street food of Indonesia

References

Indonesian snack foods
Banana dishes
Vegetarian dishes of Indonesia
Deep fried foods
Street food in Indonesia